Charles Stebbins (June 23, 1789 – March 23, 1873) was an American lawyer and politician from New York. Stebbins served as a member of the New York State Senate and as acting Lieutenant Governor of New York in 1829.

Early life and education
Stebbins was born in Williamstown, Massachusetts. After graduating from Williams College in 1807, he studied law and was admitted to the bar in 1810.

Career 
Prior to entering politics, Stebbins worked as a lawyer in Cazenovia, New York.

He was a member of the New York State Senate from 1826 to 1829, sitting in the 49th, 50th, 51st and 52nd New York State Legislatures. When Governor Van Buren resigned to become Secretary of State in March 1829, and Lieutenant Governor Enos T. Throop succeeded to the governorship, Stebbins was elected President pro tempore of the State Senate and was Acting Lieutenant Governor of New York until the end of 1829.

He was one of the three Bank Commissioners, appointed by the Governor. In 1842, he served as president of the Farmers' Loan and Trust Company in New York City.

Personal life 
In 1819, he married Eunice Masters. He was buried at the Evergreen Cemetery in Cazenovia, New York.

Sources

1789 births
1873 deaths
Lieutenant Governors of New York (state)
New York (state) state senators
People from Cazenovia, New York
Williams College alumni
People from Williamstown, Massachusetts
19th-century American politicians